Last Call in Jonestown is the third studio album by Polkadot Cadaver, released on May 14, 2013.

Album information
The album is the first album with Scott Radway on drums, who has been a live member of the band since 2010. On June 15, 2013, the album entered the Billboard Heatseekers chart at number 38. Later in the year, plans were announced for a colored vinyl release of the album. Limited to 500 copies, the vinyl became available for pre-order on September 27 and began to ship in early November 2013.

Track listing

Personnel
Todd Smith - Vocals, Guitar, Bass
Jasan Stepp - Guitar, Bass, Keyboards
Scott Radway - Drums, Keyboards, Guitar, Bass (except tracks 3 and 11)

Additional Personnel
Dave Cullen - Bass (tracks 3 and 11)
John Ensminger - Drums (tracks 3 and 11)
Neil Fallon - Vocals (track 11)
Jon Radway - Saxophone (track 10)
Carl Bahner - Trumpet (tracks 10)
Drew Lamonde – Engineering
Steve Wright – Mixing, Mastering
Patrick Lamond – Cover art

References

Polkadot Cadaver albums
2013 albums
Cultural depictions of Jim Jones